Seemarekha is a Bengali television family drama. It premiered on 23 October 2017, and airs on Zee Bangla at 8:30 pm. It is produced by Surinder Films and stars Indrani Haldar in titular double role and Abhishek Bose and Diya Mukherjee in parallel lead roles and Sudip Sarkar as an antagonist.

Cast
 Indrani Haldar in dual role:-
Simantini Guha Roy  Seema: Rekha's elder sister; Sitangshu's wife; Pratik, Pala, Pakhi's mother.(Main Antagonist)
Ruprekha Guha Roy aka Rekha: Seema's half an hour younger sister; Subhrangshu's wife. (Main Protagonist)
 Diya Mukherjee as Bindi Mitra/Sristi.
 Abhishek Bose as Priyojeet Mitra aka Jeet/ Sounak.
Badshah Moitra as Subhrangshu Guha Roy: Ruprekha's second husband; Seetangshu's youngest brother; Aparna's younger son.
 Debdut Ghosh as Sitangshu Guha Roy: Simantini's husband; Subhrangshu's elder brother; Aparna's elder son; Pratik, Pala, Pakhi's father.
Ananya Chattopadhyay as Aparna Guha Roy: Rekha and Seema's mother-in-law; Sitangshu and Subhrangshu's mother; Proyojeet and Piyali's paternal aunt.
 Sudip Sarkar as Rick
 Soumi Ghosh as Pola
 Priyanka Bhattacharjee as Tilottoma
 Dipanjan Bhattacharya as Tushar
 Rumpa Chatterjee as Kamini
 Alivia Sarkar as Tiya
 Prantik Banerjee as Korno
 Dolon Roy as Ranjana
 Biplab Banerjee as Jeet's father 
 Ritoja Majumder as Jeet's mother 
 Ashmita Chakraborty as Piyali
 Kaushambi Chakraborty as Ahona
 Kaushiki Guha as Rick's mother 
 Shankar Debnath as Ratan
 Rajib Basu as Pratik

References

Bengali-language television programming in India
2017 Indian television series debuts
2019 Indian television series endings
Zee Bangla original programming